Pedro Darío Suárez Castro (born 8 August 1992) is a Cuban footballer who currently plays for FC Tulsa in the USL Championship.

Club career

AFC Ann Arbor
In 2016, Suárez joined AFC Ann Arbor in the National Premier Soccer League. In June 2017, he received a 6-month suspension for kicking the ball against a referee.

Miami FC 2
On 2 May 2018, Suárez joined Miami FC 2 of the National Premier Soccer League.

FC Tulsa
On 18 December 2019, Suárez moved to the USL Championship, joining FC Tulsa ahead of their 2020 season.

International career
He made his international debut for Cuba in an August 2014 friendly match against Panama and has earned a total of 4 caps, scoring no goals.

He was called up to the 2015 CONCACAF Gold Cup in the United States and played in games against Mexico, and Trinidad and Tobago, before defecting during his time there.

Personal life

Defection to the United States
Suárez reportedly left his Charlotte hotel for a walk to the supermarket in July 2015, but did not return to the national team set-up. He was the third Cuban player to defect during the tournament, after Keyler García and Arael Argüelles, with Ariel Martinez following him to be the fourth.

References

External links
 
 Player profile - Ann Arbor

1992 births
Living people
Sportspeople from Havana
Defecting Cuban footballers
Association football wingers
Cuban footballers
Cuba international footballers
Cuba youth international footballers
2015 CONCACAF Gold Cup players
FC Ciudad de La Habana players
AFC Ann Arbor players
National Premier Soccer League players
National Independent Soccer Association players
Cuban expatriate footballers
Expatriate soccer players in the United States
Cuban expatriate sportspeople in the United States
Miami FC players
FC Tulsa players